Galesh Mahalleh (also Romanized as Gālesh Maḩalleh) is a village in Chehel Shahid Rural District, in the Central District of Ramsar County, Mazandaran Province, Iran. At the 2006 census, its population was 687, in 204 families.

References 

Populated places in Ramsar County